Thomas Cranston (1891 – 13 January 1916) was a Scottish professional footballer who played in the Scottish League for Raith Rovers, Third Lanark and Clyde as an outside right.

Personal life 
After the outbreak of the First World War in August 1914, Cranston enlisted as a private in The Black Watch (Royal Highlanders). He was killed in action in Iraq on 13 January 1916, during the Mesopotamian campaign. He was buried in Amara War Cemetery.

Honours 
Clyde

 Glasgow Cup: 1914–15

References 

1891 births
1916 deaths
Scottish footballers
Association football outside forwards
Raith Rovers F.C. players
Scottish Football League players
British Army personnel of World War I
British military personnel killed in World War I
Third Lanark A.C. players
Footballers from North Ayrshire
Black Watch soldiers
Clyde F.C. players
Burials at Amara War Cemetery
People from Ardrossan